Engadine is a suburb in southern Sydney, in the state of New South Wales, Australia.

History
The area was reserved for a national park in 1879, but in 1890 Charles McAlister was able to purchase land here which became known as McAlister’s Estate. After an overseas trip, the family renamed their estate ‘Engadine’ after the Engadin Valley in Switzerland. The wildflowers in the valley here and surrounding national parks were reminiscent of the valley and hills in Engadin.

Charles McAlister subdivided his land sometime after 1900. He continued to live in Engadine but later moved to Cronulla, where he died in 1915.

Originally settled for grazing land, Engadine soon became a destination for camping and day-trips from the inner-Sydney suburbs. It remained isolated until 1920 when the railway station was built (with some funds donated by the local population). Many ex-soldiers settled here after World War I and several streets here recall this war and others as well, such as Anzac, Tobruk, Amiens, Bullecourt, Villers Brett, and Nelson.

Dunlea Centre, Australia's original Boys' Town, in the western part of the suburb was modelled on the American Boys Town institution. The residential school and day programs help children, regardless of their religious background, who have not been able to conform to the rules of society. It was founded in 1939 by Father Thomas Dunlea who was principal from 1939 to 1951.

The post office was opened on 1 January 1927 and the school opened in September 1932. In the 1960s, the district became more established as a residential area and Crown Land was released for private purchase. The remaining land-parcels were developed in the 1990s, in North Engadine and Woronora Heights.

Landmarks

Engadine is bounded by The Royal National Park to the east, and Heathcote National Park to the west. Visitors to the suburb can view across the Sydney Basin from its southern edge northwards to the Sydney CBD.  The area also features rolling sandstone slopes and cliffs in places, with an abundance of native trees throughout. Natural landmarks include 'the Needles' and 'the Blue Lagoon' along the Woronora River, and the Engadine Wetlands to the east of the railway station.

Commercial area
Engadine is mostly residential with some commercial and light industrial areas. The commercial area is located close to Engadine railway station and the Princes Highway. A shopping centre called Engadine Central includes supermarkets, grocery and specialty shops and Engadine Library.

Transport
Engadine railway station is on the Illawarra line of the Sydney Trains network. It is located close to the Princes Highway. Bus Routes 991, 992, 993 and 996 are served by Transdev NSW.

A road built by using soft plastics and glass mixed with recycled asphalt has been laid on the Old Princes Highway between Cooper Street and Engadine Road.

Schools
 Engadine High School
 Engadine Public School
 Engadine West Public School
 Marton Public School
 St John Bosco College
 St John Bosco Primary School

Churches

Connect Church
Engadine Anglican Church]
Engadine Congregational Church
Engadine Jehovah's Witnesses
Engadine Presbyterian Church
Engadine Uniting Church
Exclusive Brethren
Heathcote-Engadine Baptist Church
Salvation Army
Southern Cross Baptist Church
St John Bosco Catholic Church

Community
The Engadine community revolves around the town centre which comprises boutique shops, banks, restaurants, cafes, and three of the major supermarkets.  At the heart of the township is the Engadine Community Centre which is a public meeting space and houses Essential Community Solutions (ECS). ECS is a not for profit, non-government community-based organization. Established in the 1970s ECS works to enhance community capacity through the provision of programs and services for the aged, youth, children, families, individuals, people with a disability, their carers and the community as a whole.

Engadine District Youth Services (EDYS) provides free community assistance to the local youth, providing a safe, non-judgmental space where Young People can relax with friends, get involved in fun activities and also explore challenges or decisions they may be facing with the support of qualified Youth Workers.  Most of the local churches also run community playtime groups for parents with pre-schoolers and also run community youth groups.

Annual free community events include the Rotary Club of Engadine's 'Carols for the People' (Cooper St Park) around Christmas each year since 2007; McAlister Community Fete run by the Lions Club with rides and stalls run at Cooper St Park annually since 1988; and 'Q Club' – a free daily kids program for primary aged kids in the community, running in the second week of the winter holidays at the Baptist Church every year since 1995.

Parks and recreation

Public facilities include public parks, a skate park and gardens.
 Engadine Leisure Centre is a heated outdoor aquatic centre and gym
Ferntree Reserve and Park, used by Engadine Eagles netball
 Anzac Oval is used for rugby league by the Engadine Dragons, Cricket by the Engadine Dragons CC, and Soccer by the Engadine Eagles
 Preston Park is used for soccer by the Engadine Crusaders F.C. and cricket by the Engadine Dragons CC.
 Engadine Lawn Bowls Club
  Engadine Returned Services Club (RSL)
 Old Bush Road is used for rugby union by the Engadine Lions established in 1994, now featuring teams in the Illawarra and Sydney competitions. Old Bush Rd is also used for touch footy in the Summer off-Season.
 Cooper Street Reserve

Services

 Engadine Rural Fire Brigade protects the bush interface and valleys surrounding the Engadine area.
 Engadine Ambulance Station
 Fire and Rescue NSW Engadine (Station 33)
 Engadine District Youth Services

Population
According to the 2016 census of Population, there were 17,375 people in Engadine.
 Aboriginal and Torres Strait Islander people made up 1.4% of the population. 
 The most common ancestries were Australian 31.2%, English 31.1%, Irish 10.1%, Scottish 7.4% and German 2.4%.
 84.5% of people were born in Australia. The next most common countries of birth were England 3.9% and New Zealand 1.3%.
 91.8% of people spoke only English at home. 
 The most common responses for religion were Catholic 30.5%, No Religion 25.6% and Anglican 23.2%.

Notable people
 Les Bursill – Aboriginal historian and archaeologist 
 Billy Dib – World Champion Boxer, IBF Featherweight Champion (2011–2013)
 Thomas Dunlea – Founder of Dunlea Centre, Australia's original Boys' Town
 Robbie Kearns – Rugby League player
 Rodney Martin - squash player
 Paul O'Grady - soccer player
 Robert Stone – (1956–2005), Rugby League player for St. George Dragons
 Markus Zusak – Author

References

External links 
  [CC-By-SA]

Suburbs of Sydney
Sutherland Shire